Galium migrans is a species of flowering plant in the family Rubiaceae. Following a revision of the genus Galium, the distribution of Gallium migrans is now believed to be restricted to South Australia. Plants in New South Wales that were formerly identified as this species are  currently identified as Galium leptogonium.

Subspecies
Three subspecies are recognized as of May 2014:

Galium migrans subsp. inversum I.Thomps.
Galium migrans subsp. migrans
Galium migrans subsp. trichogynum I.Thomps.

References

Gentianales of Australia
migrans
Flora of South Australia
Plants described in 1983